Coquitlam Town Centre is the main commercial and retail neighbourhood for the city of Coquitlam, British Columbia. The Town Centre also contains the highest concentration of high-rise condominiums in the Tri-Cities and northeastern Metro Vancouver.

History

The concept of a town centre for the area dates back to 1975. In 1979, Coquitlam Centre Mall was built and became the main catalyst for the creation of a Town Centre. Over the following years, rapid population growth took place as new housing and low rise apartment developments were built over previously forested areas.

In the early 2000s, the City of Coquitlam updated the Town Centre Plan. Shortly thereafter during the mid 2000s, City Centre began to densify as various high-rise condominium developments took place. This is reflected in the rapid population growth of the recent decade, as City Centre grew by over 15% from 2011 to 2016.

The intent is to have a concentration of high-density housing, offices, cultural, entertainment and education facilities to serve major growth areas of the region, served by rapid transit service.

Coquitlam Town Centre is currently undergoing an update of the Town Centre plan.

Geography
Geographically, Coquitlam has two large parcels of land (one in the south-west, the other in the north-east), with a smaller central area between them. This central area, Coquitlam Town Centre, was designated as a "Regional Town Centre" under the Metro Vancouver's Livable Region Strategic Plan.

Demographics

Population
Upon completion of the Coquitlam Centre Mall in 1979, the population of Coquitlam's City Centre was estimated to be 5,000.

Today, City Centre has grown to a population of 31,380.

Ethnicity

Language

Rapid Transit

Evergreen Extension
Three stations for the Evergreen Extension are in operation in the town centre - Coquitlam Central, Lincoln, and Lafarge Lake-Douglas Station, which is the terminus of the SkyTrain line.

Facilities
Public facilities presently at the Town Centre Park area include:

Parks
Glen Park
Town Centre Park

Retail and Shopping
Coquitlam Centre - constructed in 1979 is the main mall in the City Centre.

Other major retail centres:
Pinetree Village
Sunwood Square
Henderson Place Mall
Westwood Mall
Various mini malls in the Glen and Johnson area

Schools

Elementary

 Glen Elementary
 Walton Elementary
 Nestor Elementary

Middle

 Maple Creek Middle
 Scott Creek Middle

Secondary

 Gleneagle Secondary
 Pinetree Secondary

College

 Douglas College (David Lam Campus)

References

Neighbourhoods in Coquitlam